Strike is a 1925 Soviet silent drama film directed and edited by Sergei Eisenstein. Originating as one entry out of a proposed seven-part series titled "Towards Dictatorship of the Proletariat", Strike was a joint collaboration between the Proletcult Theatre and the film studio Goskino. As Eisenstein's first full-length feature film, it marked his transition from theatre to cinema, and his next film Battleship Potemkin emerged from the same film cycle.

Arranged in six parts, the film depicts a strike in 1903 by the workers of a factory in pre-revolutionary Russia, and their subsequent suppression. It is best known for a sequence towards the climax, in which the violent suppression of the strike is cross-cut with footage of cattle being slaughtered, and similar animal metaphors are used throughout the film to describe of various individuals.

Upon release, Strike received praise from critics, but many audiences were confused by its eccentric style. It received little international distribution until its reappraisal during the 1950s and 1960s. It is now recognized as one of Eisenstein's more accessible works and a major influence on many of his contemporaries.

Plot summary

The film opens with a quotation from Vladimir Lenin: 
The strength of the working class is organization. Without organization of the masses, the proletarian is nothing. Organized it is everything. Being organized means unity of action, unity of practical activity.

На заводе всё спокойно / At the factory all is quiet
Using typography, the word "но" (but) is added to the title of the chapter which then animates and dissolves into an image of machinery in motion.
The administration is spying on the workers, reviewing a list of agents with vivid code names. Vignettes are shown of them. Conditions are tense with agitators and Bolsheviks planning a strike prior to the catalytic event.
Повод к стачке / Reason to strike
A micrometer is stolen, with a value of 25 rubles or 3 weeks pay. A worker, Yakov, is accused of the theft and subsequently hangs himself. Fighting ensues and work stops. The workers leave the milling room running and resistance is met at the foundry. The strikers throw rocks and loose metal through the foundry windows. Then locked within the gates of the complex, the crowd confronts the office. They force open the gates and seize a manager carting him off in a wheel barrow dumping them down a hill into the water. The crowd disperses.

Завод замер / The factory dies down
The chapter begins with footage of ducklings, kittens, piglets, and geese. A child then wakes his father for work ironically with no work to do, they laugh and frolic. The factory is shown vacant and still with birds moving in. The children act out what their fathers had done, wheelbarrowing a goat in a mob. The owner is frustrated by orders arriving and the frozen plant. Demands are formulated: an 8-hour work day, fair treatment by the administration, 30% wage increases, and a 6-hour day for minors. The shareholders get involved with the director and read the demands. They discuss dismissively while smoking cigars and having drinks. Presumably on the orders of the shareholders, the police raid the workers, and they sit down to protest. At their meeting the shareholders use the demand letter as a rag to clean up a spill, and a lemon squeezer metaphorically represents the pressure the stockholders intend to apply to the strikers.
Стачка затягивается / The strike draws out
Scenes are shown of a line forming at a store which is closed, and a baby needing food. A fight occurs at a home between a man and a woman, subsequently she leaves. Another man rummages through his home for goods to sell at a flea market, upsetting his family. A posted letter publicly shows the administrators rejection of the demands. Using a hidden camera in a pocket watch, a spy named "Owl" photographs someone stealing the letter. The pictures are transferred to another spy. The man is beaten, captured, and beaten again.
Провокация на разгром / Provocation and debacle
The scene opens with dead cats dangling from a structure.
A character is introduced, a "King of Thieves" whose throne is made of a derelict automobile amidst rubbish, and who leads a community that lives in enormous barrels buried with only their top openings above ground. After a deal with a tsarist police agent, the "King" hires a few provocateurs from among his community to set fire, raze, and loot a liquor store. A crowd gathers at the fire and the alarm is sounded. The crowd leaves to avoid being provoked but are set upon by the firemen with their hoses regardless.

Ликвидация / Extermination
The governor sends in the military. A child walks under the soldiers' horses and his mother goes under to get him and is struck. Rioting commences, and the crowd is chased off through a series of gates and barriers heading to the forge, then their apartments. The crowd is chased and whipped on the balconies. A policeman murders a small child. The workers are driven into a field by the army and shot en masse. This is shown with alternating footage of the slaughtering of a cow.

Cast
 Maksim Shtraukh — Police spy
 Grigori Aleksandrov — Factory foreman
 Mikhail Gomorov — Worker
 I. Ivanov — Chief of police
  — Revolutionary
 Aleksandr Antonov — Member of strike committee
  — Queen of thieves
 Anatoli Kuznetsov
 Vera Yanukova
 Vladimir Uralsky (as V. Uralsky)
 Misha Mamin

Production

Development

Prior to Strike, Eisenstein had primarily worked in experimental theatre, as a designer and director with the Proletcult Theatre. , head of the First Goskino factory, wanted to recruit Eisenstein to work in cinema, but Proletcult wanted to keep him. They negotiated and decided on a joint collaboration, a film cycle called "Towards Dictatorship of the Proletariat". The cycle was to be a historical panorama focused on lessons learned by the Russian working class during the pre-revolutionary period, through political activities such as strikes and underground publications. It had seven parts: Geneva-Russia, Underground, May Day, 1905, Strike, Prison Riots and Escapes, and October.

Of those, 1905 and Strike were identified as having mass appeal. Strike was selected to enter production first as a joint production between Proletcult and Goskino. One of the episodes from 1905 would later be expanded to form Eisenstein's second feature, Battleship Potemkin. The screenplay was written by Valerian Pletnyov, Grigori Aleksandrov, and Eisenstein. They used memoirs of the Bolsheviks and troves of historical documents as source material for the script.

Pre-production
Studio head Boris Mikhin introduced Eisenstein to cinematographer Eduard Tisse, who had started his career as a newsreel cameraman during the Civil War. Eisenstein spent several months researching labor struggles. He interviewed strikers and activists, visited factories, and read Émile Zola's novel Germinal. He worked on the script with Esfir Shub at her house; however, after it was officially accepted he removed her from the project.

Eisenstein cast many of the roles from the Proletcult Theatre. Actors and students from the studio filled other parts, and crowd scenes were populated by factory workers from Moscow.

Filming
Production began in early 1924. The board of Goskino was afraid that Eisenstein would produce a plotless "montage of attractions". After two days of test shoots, the board decided to remove Eisenstein from the project. Only after Mikhin and Tisse personally guaranteed the film's completion was Eisenstein was given a third test shoot and allowed to continue with production. During filming, he continued to quarrel with the studio over enormous demands, such as a thousand extras to form a mob in a scene from part five. Much of the crew resented him over the stringent production process, but Eisenstein was generally unaware.

Style and themes

Strike applies Eisenstein's principle of "montage of attractions". Developed during his work in theatre, the principle stipulates that each moment of a work should be filled with surprise and intensity. His influential essay, Montage of Attractions, was written between production and premiere.

Eisenstein's editing is rapid, even compared to other Soviet filmmakers of the era. Strike has an average shot length of 2.5 seconds, less than half that of a typical Hollywood film. Dissolves, traditionally used to indicate the passage of time between shots, are used instead as a visual effect. In some scenes, the aspect ratio is dynamic, with masks in front of the camera being added or removed to change the framing of a shot. The film also makes use of multiple exposures and iris shots.

Eisenstein uses multiple visual motifs that, after being established with one side of the conflict, change over the course of the narrative arc. Early on, animal identities distinguish the police spies, and pushing goat in a wheelbarrow is equated to throwing out the factory manager. At the end of the film, shots of a bull being slaughtered are used to symbolize violence against the workers. Images of puddles and swimming link water to the workers early in the film. Later on, a heavy rain appears during the capture of the first leader, and firemen attack the workers with large jets of water. Circular shapes are originally associated with the workers, through images of spinning flywheels and turbines. During the strike the wheels are stopped, and the motif reappears as the barrels in which the provocateurs live and the wheels of the fire truck.

Release

Although Strike was completed in late 1924, its release was delayed because of a shortage of positive film stock. The film premiered in Leningrad on 1 February 1925. It had a public viewing on 9 March and had a theatrical release on 28 April. In the years after its initial release, Strike received little international distribution, only to Germany and Austria. The film was re-released in 1967 with a musical score.

Reception
For Pravda, Mikhail Koltsov called Strike "the first revolutionary creation of our cinema." However, public reaction to the film was mixed, particularly regarding its satire and grotesquerie. Proletcult officials attacked the film's "superfluous, self-directed formalism and gimmickry". Authorities were critical of its eccentricity and the relation between its ideological content and form.

At the 1925 International Exhibition of Modern Decorative and Industrial Arts in Paris, Eisenstein was awarded a gold medal for Strike. After the film's first British screening in 1956, Ivor Montagu noted the combination of realism and "fantastic clowning, remarking that, "there springs a lavish shower of fireworks: violations of every canon, experiments in method, such an abundance of trial runs as was never dreamed of in cinema before or seen since in a single work; diabolical and wavering changes of mood…everything in such overpowering quantity". In the New Statesman, David Sylvester likened its rhythmic editing to T. S. Eliot's poem The Waste Land, writing that "it operates through…scattered images, each of them precisely concrete yet also symbolic, the juxtaposition of which startles and surprises."

Western cinema audiences rediscovered Strike during the mid 1960s, appreciating its vibrant eccentricity. In a review for Les Temps modernes, Christian Zimmer described the film as "a memory of future fusillades". Geoff Andrew of Time Out called it Eisenstein's "most watchable" film, adding that "the harshly beautiful imagery…roots the movie effortlessly in down-to-earth reality, but its relentless energy and invention transform the whole thing into a raucous, rousing hymn to human dignity and courage."

Legacy
The film was an influence on directors Alexander Dovzhenko and Fridrikh Ermler. Its innovations were embraced by the  group, with director Grigori Kozintsev saying, "We must all see Strike again and again, until we can understand it and adopt its power for our own."

In the United States, Strike is now part of Anthology Film Archives' Essential Cinema Repertory collection.

Francis Ford Coppola revives/quotes the slaughtering of the cow metaphor at the end of Apocalypse Now (1979)

Notes

References
 .
 .
 .
 .
 .

External links

 
 
 
 
 Strike watchable on RussianFilmHub.com with English subtitles

1925 drama films
Soviet black-and-white films
Soviet silent feature films
Soviet drama films
Russian drama films
Films about the labor movement
Films shot in Moscow
Mosfilm films
Soviet revolutionary propaganda films
Films directed by Sergei Eisenstein
Articles containing video clips
1925 directorial debut films
Russian black-and-white films
Russian silent feature films
Films set in the Russian Empire
Films about labor relations
Silent drama films